William Kennedy Clowney (March 21, 1797 – March 12, 1851) was a U.S. Representative from South Carolina.

Biography

Early life
Born in Union County, South Carolina, Clowney attended private schools and an academy. He was graduated from the South Carolina College at Columbia in 1818.

Career
He taught in the public schools of Unionville and later at the University of South Carolina. He served as member of the State house of representatives 1830–1831. He was admitted to the bar and began practice in Union. He served as commissioner in equity of South Carolina 1830–1833.

He was elected as a Nullifier to the Twenty-third Congress (March 4, 1833 – March 3, 1835) and then again as a Nullifier to the Twenty-fifth Congress (March 4, 1837 – March 3, 1839). He served as chairman of the Committee on Expenditures in the Department of War for the Twenty-fifth Congress. He served as member of the State senate in 1840. He also served as Lieutenant Governor of South Carolina.

Death
He died in Union, South Carolina, on March 12, 1851, and was interred in Fairforest Cemetery, South Carolina.

Sources

1797 births
1851 deaths
People from Union County, South Carolina
Nullifier Party members of the United States House of Representatives from South Carolina